Thomas Crompton may refer to:

 Thomas Crompton (died 1601), English MP for Steyning, Radnor, Leominster and Beverley
 Thomas Crompton (died c.1607), English MP for Newton (Isle of Wight) (UK Parliament constituency) and Newport, Isle of Wight
 Thomas Crompton (died 1608), English politician who sat in the House of Commons at various times between 1597 and 1609
 Thomas Crompton (died 1645) (c. 1580–1645), English MP for Staffordshire (UK Parliament constituency) 1614, 1621 and 1628
 Thomas Crompton (Parliamentarian), English politician who sat in the House of Commons at various times between 1647 and 1660

See also
Thomas Compton, American football player